Faisalabad Railway Station is located in Faisalabad city (formerly Lyallpur), Punjab province of Pakistan on the Khanewal-Wazirabad Branch Line. The station grants passengers from Karachi, Lahore, Rawalpindi, Islamabad, Quetta, Peshawar and many more cities and towns of Pakistan access to all parts of Pakistan.  The administrative office, headed by an Assistant Operation Officer, of the Faisalabad section of Pakistan Railways is also in the station building.  A large amount of cargo is exported from and imported into Faisalabad daily.

There was railway line between Jaranwala and Faisalabad between 1926 and 1940, Jaranwala-Lyallpur Branch Line railway stations and railway track land still existed.

Facilities
The Faisalabad railway station has all the basic facilities, including a parking lot; current- and advance-reservation offices for ticket purchases; food, drink, and book stalls on the platforms; and cargo and parcel services.

Booking and ticketing area
The booking and ticketing area lies in the northern building of the railway station.  There are separate counters for premium classes and 2nd class.  All these counters provide computerized ticketing.

Waiting halls
Waiting halls are also located in the northern building of railway station complex.  A common waiting area serves all 2nd class passengers, and a separate air conditioned waiting hall exists for premium class passengers.

Cargo area
Faisalabad railway station also provides facilities to the people to book non industrial cargo at the station.  This facility includes cargo booking and delivery, and is situated in the northwest building of the railway station complex.

Admin offices
The admin offices that include management offices for Faisalabad railway station and Faisalabad railway region, railway police and security, station master and other administrative services lie in the southern building of the railway station.

Platforms
Faisalabad railway station serves the passenger trains through five platforms. Two additional platforms are exclusively for maintenance and services of locomotives and bogies.

See also
 List of railway stations in Pakistan
 Jaranwala-Lyallpur Branch Line
 Pakistan Railways
 Faisalabad
 Faisalabad International Airport
 Lahore
 Punjab (Pakistan)
 Pakistan

References

External links

Railway stations in Faisalabad District
Railway stations opened in 1895
Railway stations on Khanewal–Wazirabad Line